Nowgowski (masculine), Nowgowska (feminine) is a Polish surname. Notable people with the surname include:
Adrian Nogowski (born 1990), Polish handball player
Ewa Kowalkowska née Nogowska (born 1975), Polish volleyball player
John Nogowski (born 1993), American baseball player

Polish-language surnames